Palimos ng Pag-ibig may refer to:

Palimos ng Pag-ibig (film) - original 1985 Filipino film
Palimos ng Pag-ibig (TV series) - a Filipino TV series based on the film